Savage Pellucidar is a 1963 fantasy story collection by American writer Edgar Rice Burroughs, the seventh and final book in his series about the fictional "hollow earth" land of Pellucidar.  It was published twelve years after Burroughs's death.

Like a number of other posthumously published books by Burroughs, this book is not a novel but a collection of short stories. The first three stories, The Return to Pellucidar, Men of the Bronze Age and Tiger Girl, were published in the magazine Amazing Stories in February, March, and April 1942. The fourth story, Savage Pellucidar, was published for the first time in November 1963 after being discovered in a safe by Burroughs' son Hulbert in the early 1960s.

Stories
"The Return to Pellucidar"
"Men of the Bronze Age"
"Tiger Girl"
"Savage Pellucidar"

Plot
In "The Return to Pellucidar", David Innes goes for a  war and becomes  a POW again, while Abner Perry makes a balloon which escapes with Dian the Beautiful in it.
In "Men of the Bronze Age", Dian meets the people who have advanced to a Bronze Age cultural level and is taken to be a goddess.
In "Tiger Girl", David Innes goes after Dian in another balloon and plays the role of a god.
In "Savage Pellucidar", two separate search parties look for the lost ones with neither knowing that the other has already found the one they are seeking.

Copyright
The copyright for this story was renewed in the United States on 9 December 1991 by Edgar Rice Burroughs, Inc. (renewal reference number: RE0000570901).  The copyright should therefore expire in the United States on 1 January 2059.  The copyright for this story has expired in Australia, and thus now resides in the public domain there.  The text is available via Project Gutenberg Australia.

References

External links
 
 
 ERBzine C.H.A.S.E.R ENCYCLOPEDIA entry for Savage Pellucidar
 Edgar Rice Burroughs Summary Project Page for Savage Pellucidar

1963 short story collections
American adventure novels
American fantasy novels
American science fiction short stories
Fantasy short story collections
Novels about dinosaurs
Pellucidar novels by Edgar Rice Burroughs
Science fiction short story collections
Short story collections by Edgar Rice Burroughs
Works originally published in Amazing Stories